Suffolk New College (formerly Suffolk College) is a further education college in Ipswich. It provides courses for students from across south Suffolk. In 2009 it constructed a new building costing £70 million.

Overview 
Suffolk New College is a multi-campus mixed general further education college, with the main campus located in central Ipswich. The College also runs Suffolk Rural College (Previously Otley College) and On The Coast  (Previously Alde Valley Sixth Form). The College offers secondary and further education courses such as vocational programmes, T Levels, GCSEs and apprenticeships as well as some higher education and leisure learning courses.

Ofsted 
Ofsted visited the College between 15 and 18 November 2022 and awarded the College with a 'Good' grade with 'Outstanding' in personal development.

Facilities 
The College was founded in 2009 after the then Suffolk College was split into Suffolk New College, dealing with further education, and University Campus Suffolk dealing with higher education courses. In August 2009 a new building costing £70 million was created for the college. The 22,000 square metre building consists of four floors with a range of facilities surrounding a central atrium which rises to three storeys.

Facilities include a range of classrooms, workshops and other learning and support spaces. A fine dining restaurant and a deli are run by students on catering courses. The restaurant, Chefs' Whites, is open to the public. Workshops include automotive, construction and IT workshops.

Suffolk New College Sports Centre was built more recently  and includes facilities such as a four court badminton sports hall and two multi-purpose rooms available for public use.

New Facilities 
In 2022 the College officially unveiled its new £2.4 million Tech Campus in Ipswich. The opening was made official by TV star and Jimmy's Farm owner Jimmy Doherty, who's shows include Channel 4's 'Food Unwrapped' and 'Jamie & Jimmy's Friday Night Feast', which he does with childhood friend, Jamie Oliver. Jimmy, who is a patron of the college, originally gained advice at the Suffolk Rural campus of Suffolk New College when he was starting out in farming and has maintained a link with the college ever since.

In 2022 the College was given the green light to build their four-storey health and social care block with a mock hospital.

University of Suffolk at Suffolk New College 
Suffolk New College is a partner college of the University of Suffolk and delivers Civil Engineering and Teacher Training programmes.

Campuses 
The College has campuses in Ipswich, Otley, Leiston and Halesworth

Notable alumni
 Stuart Humphryes - film and video colouriser (enrolled 1988-1991)
 Asami Zdrenka - member of girl group Neon Jungle
 Barns Courtney - professional musician

See also
 List of tallest buildings and structures in Ipswich

References

External links
 Suffolk New College website

Further education colleges in Suffolk
Education in Ipswich
Educational institutions established in 2009
2009 establishments in England